Vsevolod IV Svyatoslavich the Red (died August 1212) was a Rus' prince (a member of the Rurik dynasty). His baptismal name was Daniil. He was grand prince of Kiev (Kyiv, 1203, 1206, 1207, 1208–1212); he was also prince of Chernigov (1204–1206/1208) and of Belgorod (1205).

He was one of the most successful senior princes of the Olgovichi (the ruling dynasty of Chernigov): while he was senior prince, they for the first time established their rule over lands stretching from Halych through Kiev and Pereyaslavl to Chernigov. Architectural and circumstantial evidence suggest that he initiated building projects in Chernigov: he sent an artel’ (a team of builders) to the town where it built the Church of St. Paraskeva Pyatnisa between 1211 and 1214.

His early life
He was the third son of Sviatoslav Vsevolodovich (who later became the grand prince of Kiev) by his wife, Maria Vasilkovna of Polotsk. Between 11 October and 24 December 1178 he married a daughter of duke Kazimierz II the Just of Poland (her name is unknown).

According to some scholars, on 14 November 1179, Svyatoslav Vsevolodovich brought a daughter of duke Casimir II of Poland (her name was Anastasia according to the Lyubetskiy sinodik) as wife for Vsevolod. Vsevolod's patrimonial domain was located in the northwestern part of the Vyatichi lands.

When Khan Konchak with his Cumans pillaged the Pereyaslavl lands as far as Dimitrov in February 1184, Svyatoslav Vsevolodivich sent his sons (including Vsevolod) and his troops to prince Igor Svyatoslavich of Novgorod-Seversk ordering him to pursue the tribesmen. Igor Svyatoslavich pursued the raiders, found them at the river Khiriya (a tributary of the river Vorskla), and took many captive. Enemy bands frequently pillaged the Poros’e district (the Ros River basin) and the Chernigov lands after 1187.

In 1192, Svyatoslav Vsevolodivich sent his sons (Vsevolod, Vladimir, and Mstislav) to march against the Cumans. The purpose of the campaign (which was led again by Igor Svyatoslavich) was to plunder Cumanian camps; the Olgovichi ventured deep into the steppe, past Kursk into the upper reaches of the river Oskol. But the nomads assembled in great numbers and awaited the princes. Igor Svyatoslavich, on seeing that he was outnumbered, resolutely ordered his troops to steal away under the cover of darkness.

His father died during the last week of July 1194, and his death changed the order of seniority among the Olgovichi. His only brother, Yaroslav Vsevolodovich became the new senior prince of the dynasty, and thus Vsevolod became answerable to his uncle. In the autumn of 1196, Yaroslav Vsevolodovich ordered Vsevolod and his brother, Mstislav Svyatoslavich to accompany him against grand prince Vsevolod III Yuryevich of Vladimir and prince David Rostislavich of Smolensk who were pillaging the domains of the Olgovichi.

Prince of Chernigov and his struggle for Kiev
In 1201, Vsevolod's brother, Oleg Svyatoslavich pledged loyalty to grand prince Rurik Rostislavich of Kiev who had summoned the Olgovichi to campaign against prince Roman Mstislavich of Halych. The latter, however, pre-empted their attack, and the Kievans opened the gates of the podol’ to him; he forced Ryurik Rostislavich and the Olgovichi to capitulate. On 2 January 1203, Ryurik Rostislavich and the Olgovichi re-captured Kiev. Ryurik Rostislavich avenged himself against the Kievans; the chronicler declares that his devastation exceeded that caused by all previous attacks. Ryurik Rostislavich had no intention of occupying the town, but he could not leave Kiev without a prince for fear that it would return into Roman Mstislavich's hand. Accordingly, Vsevolod occupied the town.

However, Ryurik Rostislavich evidently appointed his ally to Kiev until he could settle his dispute with Roman Mstislavich and be reinstated. In February, Roman Mstislavich marched against Ryurik Rostislavich; the latter submitted to him and to Vsevolod III Yuryevich. Roman Mstislavich also advised him to ask Vsevolod Yuryevich to reinstate him in Kiev and promised to support his request. Consequently, the grand prince of Vladimir forgave Ryurik Rostislavich and reappointed him to the town which forced him to sever ties with the Olgovichi. Some month later, however, Roman Mstislavich seized Ryurik Rostislavich and had him tonsured as a monk.

Under the year 1204, a number of chronicles state that Oleg Svyatoslavich of Chernigov died, while others add that his son died with him. The chroniclers do not identify Oleg's successor at the time of his death, but later evidence confirms that his brother, Vsevolod replaced him. We may assume that, with the demise of Oleg Svyatoslavich's family, Vsevolod appropriated his brother's domains along with the territories Oleg himself had taken from his elder brother, Vladimir Svyatoslavich; thus, with the extinction of the lines of his two elder brothers, Vsevolod's family became the most powerful line of the Olgovichi.

On 29 June 1205, Roman Mstislavich died, and two sons survived him: Daniil and Vasilko Romanovich. The Olgovichi marched to Kiev and met Ryurik Rostislavich who had reinstated himself there; they made a pact to attack Halych. The Olgovichi had presumably promised that, in exchange for Halych, they would support Ryurik Rostislavich's rule in Kiev. Although, they achieved nothing in Halych, Ryurik Rostislavich paid Vsevolod for his support by giving him Belgorod; Vsevolod, in turn, handed it over to his brother Gleb Svyatoslavich.

In the early summer of 1206, Vsevolod assembled all the Olgovichi for a snem (a meeting) in Chernigov presumably to organize a second campaign against Halych. Vsevolod also invited prince Mstislav Romanovich of Smolensk; his Polish in-laws also brought troops, and at Kiev, Ryurik Rostislavich joined them with his troops. When the Galicians and Daniil Romanovich heard how large a force had assembled against them, they asked the king Andrew II of Hungary for help; even so, Daniil Romanovich fled to his patrimony of Volodymyr-Volynskyi. Meanwhile, Andrew II crossed the mountains and sent messengers to prince Yaroslav Vsevolodovich (a son of grand prince Vsevolod III Yuryevich) inviting him to rule Halych.

On hearing that the Hungarians stood poised for battle near Volodymyr-Volynskyi, the Olgovichi dared not attack Halych. For many days neither side made a move; finally, after the king negotiated peace with the Poles and returned home, the Olgovichi also withdrew. At that time, the Galicians sent word in secret to Vladimir Igorevich (Vsevolod's cousin) asking him to rule Halych. On receiving their invitation, Vladimir Igorevich stole away at night from the Olgovichi without informing Vsevolod; he rode to Halych, and occupied it. The Galicians also gave domains to Vladimir Igorevich's brothers. The sources do not report the fate of Novhorod-Siverskyi and the Poseme towns (along the Seym River) after the Igorevichi vacated them; to judge from an earlier example of absentee prince, the vacated towns were probably administered by Vsevolod.

After Vsevolod failed to take Halych, he took advantage of the large force at his disposal, snatched Kiev from Ryurik Rostislavich, and forced him to withdraw to Vruchiy. Vsevolod also sent his posadniki to all the Kievan towns. There can be no doubt that Vsevolod made generous concessions to the Rostislavichi (the members of the dynasty of Smolensk) to win their support: Ryurik Rostislavich's son, Rostislav Rurikovich returned to Vyshgorod and his nephew Mstislav Romanovich of Smolensk seized Belgorod. Vsevolod, however, evicted Yaroslav Vsevolodovich from Pereyaslavl, and in September, he returned to his father (grand prince Vsevolod III Yuryevich) in Suzdalia.

Although his brother, Mstislav Svyatoslavich, was next in line for a major domain after his elder brother Gleb Svyatoslavich occupied Chernigov following Vsevolod's seizure of Kiev, Vsevolod bypassed his brother and gave Pereyaslavl to his son Mikhail Vsevolodovich. However, Ryurik Rostislavich, the erstwhile monk, was determined to regain control of Kiev. Consequently, soon after Vsevolod occupied the town, Ryurik Rostislavich expelled him with relative ease. This is not surprising because the troops that had helped Vsevolod to capture Kiev had returned home. His failure to barricade himself in Kiev also suggests that the townsmen deserted him, and he withdrew to Chernigov.

In early 1207, Vsevolod marched against Kiev, but this time his attacking force constituted only his brothers Gleb and Mstislav Svyatoslavich with their sons; the Cumans came in the main to pillage. They pillaged around Kiev for 3 weeks but accomplished nothing and withdrew. Some time in the summer of 1207, Vsevolod assembled his brothers, his nephews, the Cumans, and the princes of Turov and Pinsk; prince Vladimir Igorevich of Halych also came to his aid. He approached Kiev via Trepol in order to disable Kiev's southern outposts and deprive Ryurik Rostislavich of their military assistance. Outnumbered and outmaneuvered, Ryurik Rostislavich fled to Vruchiy even before the Olgovichi reached Kiev. Vsevolod besieged Belgorod, where Mstislav Romanovich had barricaded himself, and forced him to flee to Smolensk. Next, he attacked Ryurik Rostislavich's nephew, Mstislav Mstislavich in Torchesk. Mstislav Mstislavich put up such a valiant resistance; however, when Vsevolod unleashed the Cumans onto his lands, Mstislav capitulated in order to stop their atrocities. In light of Ryurik Rostislavich's flight and Vsevolod's victories, the Kievans opened their gates.

On hearing that Vsevolod had expelled Yaroslav Vsevolodovich from Pereyaslavl, his father Vsevolod III Yuryevich summoned his eldest son Konstantin Vsevolodovich from Novgorod, prince Roman Glebovich of Ryazan with his brothers, and prince David Yuryevich of Murom. On 19 August, Vsevolod Yuryevich set out for the river Oka to meet the princes of Ryazan. After the latter arrived, two of the princelings accused their uncles of conspiring with the Olgovichi against Vsevolod Yuryevich; after satisfying himself that the accused were guilty, he took them captive on 22 September and carted them off to Vladimir. Then Vsevolod Yuryevich marched against Pronsk, where Vsevolod's son-in-law Mikhail Vsevolodovich was prince who fled to his father-in-law. On October 18 Vsevolod Yuryevich captured Pronsk and took Mikhail Vsevolodovich's wife (Vsevolod's daughter) captive. After devastating the lands of Ryazan, Vsevolod Yuryevich returned home without attacking Chernigov.

When Ryurik Rostislavich learnt that Vsevolod Yuryevich was devastating Ryazan, he rode post-haste to Kiev, drove out Vsevolod, and occupied the town. Vsevolod fled from Kiev with his wife and children. Vsevolod launched an attack against Kiev in late February 1208, but he accomplished nothing, and he must have derived some satisfaction from pillaging the environs of Kiev. However, Ryurik Rostislavich died that year; Vsevolod became the only claimant to the capital of Rus’, and he occupied Kiev.

Grand prince of Kiev
During the winter of 1210, Vsevolod and all the Olgovichi sent Metropolitan Matfey to Vsevolod Yuryevich, who had been razing the towns of Ryazan, requesting peace. The chronicler states that they submitted to him in all matters; Vsevolod Yuryevich undoubtedly demanded that the Olgovichi relinquish control of Pereyaslav. After Vsevolod submitted in all matters, Vsevolod Yuryevich released his daughter (the wife of Mikhail Vsevolodovich of Pronsk). Nevertheless, Vsevolod Yuryevich kept the princes of Ryazan in chains and refused to forgive them.

In the following year (on 10 April 1211), Vsevolod Yuryevich's son Yuri Vsevolodovich and Vsevolod's daughter Agafia Vsevolodovna were married in the Cathedral of the Mother of God in Vladimir; Vsevolod attended with his court. In September 1211, Daniil Romanovich attacked the Olgovichi in Halych and captured the towns ruled by them. The Galician boyars hanged three of Vsevolod's relatives (Roman Igorovich, Svyatoslav Igorovich, and Rostislav Romanovich). If the information of a late chronicle is true, Roman and Svyatoslav's wives and children were executed with them. Consequently, the Igorevichi were reduced to one family, that of Vladimir Igorevich. In appropriating the patrimonies of the two executed Igorevichi, Vsevolod increased his personal holdings.

The hangings in Halych were an unforgivable insult to the Olgovichi, and the ignominious murder of three of their princes called for unmitigated reprisals. At the beginning of 1212, Vsevolod waged war against the Rostislavichi. Surprisingly, he unleashed his wrath neither against the Galicians nor against Daniil Romanovich; instead, he accused the minor Rostislavichi ruling insignificant domains in the Kievan land of killing his relatives, and expelled them. In June 1212, the Rostislavichi launched a major offensive against Vsevolod to reclaim their lands. In addition to the troops that Mstislav Romanovich mustered from the Smolensk domains, Mstislav Mstislavich set out on 8 June, with the Novgorodian militia. The attackers pillaged many districts belonging to the Olgovichi beginning with Rechitsa which shows that they came down the right bank of the Dnieper River.

Vsevolod and his relatives confronted the attackers at Vyshgorod; but the Rostislavichi occupied the town. As the Rostislavichi pillaged the towns of the Olgovichi on their march to Kiev, their slow approach allowed the beleaguered inhabitants to warn Vsevolod of the advancing enemy. Accordingly, he had time to summon reinforcements, but the easy victory of the Rostislavichi suggests that they still greatly outnumbered the Olgovichi. Vsevolod fled from Kiev for the third time and sought safety in Chernigov. Although the Rostislavichi pursued him, they failed to capture the well-defended citadel. After some two weeks they succeeded only in setting fire to the outer town and in pillaging surrounding villages. As they passed their attack, Vsevolod died. As the former prince of Chernigov he was interred inside the Holy Saviour Cathedral.

Family
Married: 14 October/24 December 1178/14 November 1179: Maria (renamed Anastasia after her marriage), a daughter of Duke Casimir II of Poland by his wife Helen of Znojmo, a Přemyslid princess

Children
Grand prince Mikhail Vsevolodovich of Kiev (c. 1185 – 20 September 1246);
Agafia Vsevolodovna (died 7 February 1238), wife of Prince Yuri Vsevolodovich of Vladimir;
Vera Vsevolodovna, On the other hand, Martin Dimnik does not refer to Aleksandr Glebovich as Vsevolod Svyatoslavich's son-in-law and he states that Vsevolod Svyatoslavich had two daughters; wife of prince Mikhail Vsevolodovich of Pronsk.

Ancestors

Footnotes

Sources
Dimnik, Martin: The Dynasty of Chernigov - 1146-1246; Cambridge University Press, 2003, Cambridge; .

1212 deaths
Olgovichi family
Grand Princes of Kiev
Princes of Chernigov
13th-century princes in Kievan Rus'
Eastern Orthodox monarchs
Year of birth unknown